Denis O'Dell (2 May 1923 – 30 December 2021) was a British film producer, best known for his work on films featuring The Beatles, including Magical Mystery Tour and A Hard Day's Night.

The Beatles featured his name in the lyrics of "You Know My Name".

Early life
O'Dell was born in the London district of Kensington in 1923 to John and Elizabeth O'Dell.

Personal life
O'Dell retired to the Spanish city of Almería, which he persuaded several Hollywood directors, including Steven Spielberg and Ridley Scott, to use as a filming location. 

O'Dell died at his home in Almería on 30 December 2021, at the age of 98. He was survived by his wife, Donna and their four children, including producer Denise O'Dell. He was also the maternal grandfather of producer Denis Pedregosa.

References

External links
 

1923 births
2021 deaths
British film producers
Alumni of the University of Birmingham
People from Kensington